The Vampire Happening (They only bite at night) is a 1971 West German comedy and horror film directed by Freddie Francis.

Plot 
An American actress inherits a castle in Transylvania. What she does not know is that her ancestor, the Baroness Catali, was in actuality a vampire countess, and emerges from her tomb to ravage the nearby village and Catholic seminary.

Cast 
Pia Degermark as Betty Williams, Clarimonde
Thomas Hunter as Jens Larsen
Yvor Murillo as Josef
Ingrid van Bergen as Miss Niessen
Joachim Kemmer as Martin
Oskar Wegrostek as Abt
Ferdy Mayne as Count Dracula
Lyvia Bauer as Gabrielle
Daria Damar as Kirsten
Kay Williams
Michael Janisch
Toni Wagner
Raoul Retzer

Production
In the early 1970s, Italian producer Pier A. Caminnecci was looking for a film for his wife Pia Degermark whose previous film Elvira Madigan (1967) was a critical and financial success. Caminnecci set up an international production for her in West Germany directed by British director Freddie Francis and written by German screenwriters August Rieger and Karl-Heinz Hummel The script features a sub-plot based on Theophile Gautier's short story "La Morte Amoureuse."

Francis later stated:

I was aware from the start of the difficulties in shooting a horror parody. I really believed that I was working with normal people in the movie industry, and thought I could have made a decent film. With time, I became aware that the producer was an imbecile who treated the project like a home movie. He wanted to do the casting, make cameos in the film, and wanted his wife as an actress. It was a disaster which I can't say anything serious about.

Reception
The film was not well received. Allmovie gave the film one and a half stars out of five, stating that it is "not considered to be one of the crown jewels of the genre" In his book Comedy-Horror Films:A Chronological History, author Bruce G. Hallenbeck referred to the film as "sort of a ripoff of Polanski's The Fearless Vampire Killers" and "doesn't come within lightyears of Polanski's vision".

See also 

List of comedy films of the 1970s
List of horror films of 1971
List of German films: 1970s

References

Works cited

External links 

1971 films
West German films
German comedy horror films
1971 horror films
1970s comedy horror films
1970s German-language films
German vampire films
Films directed by Freddie Francis
Films based on short fiction
Films set in castles
1971 comedy films
Films based on works by Théophile Gautier
1970s German films